Soma was the ruler of the Kingdom of Funan and widely claimed as the first monarch of Cambodia (reigned c. 1st century). She was also the first female leader of Cambodia. She was the consort of Kaundinya I (also known as "Huntien" and "Preah Thong"). She is known as Soma (Indian), Liǔyè (柳葉,Chinese), Liễu Diệp (柳葉,Vietnamese) and Neang Neak (Khmer).

Queen Soma and her husband, Kaundinya I, are known in Khmer legend as "Preah Thong (Kaundinya) and Neang Neak (Soma)".  According to reports by two Chinese envoys, Kang Tai and Zhu Ying, the state of Funan was established by an Indian Brahmin merchant from ancient Kalinga named Kaundinya.

As per the legends, an Indian merchant ship was attacked by the pirates led by Soma, daughter of the chieftain of the local Nāga clan. The merchants led by Kaundinya fought back and fended off the attackers but the ship had been damaged and was beached for repairs. The Indians were wary of a second attack but Princess Soma was impressed by Kaundinya's bravery and proposed marriage which was accepted. The union led to the foundation of the House that became the royal dynasty of Funan which would rule the region for many generations and the royal legitimacy was also acquired through the female line in the kingdom. This also explains the reason why the serpent (Nāga) became an important part of Khmer iconography as is seen thousand years later when this historic mystical union remained an important part of the court ceremonies at Angkor during the era of the Khmer Empire.

References

1st-century Cambodian monarchs
1st-century Hindus
Cambodian Hindus
1st-century women rulers
Ancient queens regnant
Funan